Moreno Costanzo (born 20 February 1988) is a Swiss former professional footballer who played as a midfielder.

Career
Costanzo's career started with the youth teams of FC Wil. In 2006, he signed a contract at FC St. Gallen, where he played for the reserve squad only. He subsequently was on loan with FC Wil and played six games in the Swiss Challenge League without scoring. After his return to St. Gallen, the club were relegated to the Challenge League. In the 2008–09 season he scored 14 times in 27 games for his club, which successfully achieved promotion to the first division of Swiss professional football. Currently, he plays for FC Vaduz

He gave his debut for the Switzerland national team in a friendly against Austria national team in August 2010, where he scored to give Switzerland a 1–0 lead only 90 seconds after his substitution in the second half. 2015 he had been lent by BSC Young Boys to FC Aarau.

International goals
Scores and results list Switzerland's goal tally first.

Honours
FC Vaduz
Liechtenstein Football Cup (2): 2016, 2017

External links
 Moreno Costanzo on the website of the Swiss Football League
 

1988 births
Living people
Association football midfielders
Swiss men's footballers
Switzerland international footballers
Switzerland under-21 international footballers
Swiss people of Italian descent
Swiss Super League players
FC Wil players
FC St. Gallen players
BSC Young Boys players
FC Aarau players
FC Vaduz players
Swiss expatriate footballers
Swiss expatriate sportspeople in Liechtenstein
Expatriate footballers in Liechtenstein
FC Thun players